Zanha golungensis is a species of fruit plants from the family Sapindaceae that can be found in Cameroon and Zimbabwe. The species reaches  in height, and has leaflets that come in 3–7 pairs. While young, the leaves are pubescent, and by maternity, they might become elliptically oblong. The plant's apex is often acuminated and obtuse, the base of which is cuneate. The fruit that the plant gives is either pink or yellow, and is both spherical and ellipsoid.

References

External links

Dodonaeoideae
Flora of Africa
Plants described in 1896